The Shortridge's langur (Trachypithecus shortridgei) is a lutung native to Burma and China.

References

External links

Shortridge's langur
Primates of Southeast Asia
Mammals of Myanmar
Mammals of China
Fauna of Yunnan
Endangered fauna of Asia
Shortridge's langur
Taxa named by Robert Charles Wroughton